Alfred Levavasour Durell Fraser (1863 – 24 February 1919) was a Liberal Party Member of Parliament in New Zealand.

Early life and family
Fraser was born in Kaiapoi, Canterbury, in 1863 to John Marchant Fraser. He later settled in Hawke's Bay in 1881, and began a career in school-teaching for some years. Fraser then moved to Hastings, where he entered into Native Land Court advocacy. On 29 December 1892 he married Emily Teresa Dennett, the daughter of William Young Dennett who later served as mayor of Hastings.

Political career

He was elected to the Napier electorate in the 1899 general election, which he represented to 1908 when he was defeated by fellow Liberal Vigor Brown.

In 1905 the local branch of the Liberal and Labour Federation claimed Fraser was ignoring his constituents and they chose to endorse William James McGrath instead. It was one of many instances in that years election of vote splitting amongst the Liberals.

in 1911, Fraser stood as an independent for Hawke's Bay 'to support or oppose measures as his principles directed' and said he would only support Joseph Ward's ministry if it did what he himself thought was right. He was unsuccessful. Fraser's name was also on the ballot for the Hawkes Bay by-election in 1917. However he retired from the contest, yet 9 votes were still cast for him. In May 1918, he was appointed to the Legislative Council. He served until his death at Hastings on 24 February 1919. He was buried at Hastings Cemetery.

Notes

References

1862 births
1919 deaths
New Zealand Liberal Party MPs
Members of the New Zealand Legislative Council
New Zealand Liberal Party MLCs
New Zealand MPs for North Island electorates
Members of the New Zealand House of Representatives
Unsuccessful candidates in the 1896 New Zealand general election
Unsuccessful candidates in the 1908 New Zealand general election
19th-century New Zealand politicians
Burials at Hastings Cemetery, New Zealand